Paul Männik (born 3 September 1901 in Kabala Parish (now Türi Parish), Kreis Fellin – 25 January 1987, Mercer Island, Washington) was an Estonian politician. He was a member of IV Riigikogu, representing the Farmers' Assemblies. He was a member of the Riigikogu since 9 January 1932. He replaced Ado Johanson. On 14 March 1932, he resigned his position and he was replaced by Johannes Võmma. Männik and his family emigrated from Estonia and settled in Ohio in 1950.

References

1901 births
1987 deaths
People from Türi Parish
People from Kreis Fellin
Farmers' Assemblies politicians
Members of the Riigikogu, 1929–1932
20th-century Estonian lawyers
University of Tartu alumni
Estonian military personnel of the Estonian War of Independence
Recipients of the Military Order of the Cross of the Eagle
Estonian World War II refugees
Estonian emigrants to the United States